Sekolah Menengah Kebangsaan Taman Tun Dr. Ismail (Taman Tun Dr. Ismail National Secondary School) or SMKTTDI is a secondary school located along Jalan Leong Yew Koh, in Taman Tun Dr. Ismail, a main township in Kuala Lumpur, Malaysia. It was founded in 1980.

History 
Taman Tun Dr Ismail is a township located on the outskirts of the city of Kuala Lumpur, Malaysia. Previously a plantation, the land was developed into a town starting in 1973. After the town became more populated, there was a need for a secondary school to be erected for the children of residents to continue their studies after Year 6. Hence, the Taman Tun Dr Ismail National Secondary School was established on the 18th of August 1980. The school logo was made by the Head Prefect of 1981. The school started as a government-funded secondary school and remains so to this day.

Enrollment 
The enrollment is based on the students’ performance in their Year 6 national examinations known as the Primary School Evaluation Test (UPSR).

Classes in Forms 1 to 3 are separated based on multiple criteria, such as:

 Language of Medium for Mathematics and Science
 Type of Coordinated Living Skills Elective taken up
 Type of electives taken (Music, Visual Arts, Moral Studies, etc.)

Classes in Forms 4 and 5 are separated based on stream, whether Pure Science Stream or Arts Streams.

The entry requirement for SMKTTDI is just like any other public secondary school in Malaysia — a minimum grade of C for Malay Language in UPSR.

Curriculum 
SMKTTDI offers two curriculums the Integrated Secondary School Curriculum (Kurikulum Bersepadu Sekolah Menengah)KBSM for Form 4-5 and The new curriculum ( Kurikulum Standard Sekolah Menegah )KSSM to Form 1-3 That will phase out the old KBSM by year 2021.
  To its students with the Malay and English languages being the medium of instruction. Students from Form 1 through Form 3 or the “lower secondary” forms will be studying 9 subjects as specified in the new national curriculum. At the end of Form 3, students are required to go through the Form 3 Assessment (PT3) (Pentaksiran Tingkatan 3).

Upon the completion of PT3, students will enter Form 4 or the “upper secondary” forms and they will study the Pure Science or Arts stream consisting of nine subjects until Form 5 before sitting for the Malaysian Certificate of Education (SPM) (Sijil Pelajaran Malaysia) examinations at the end of their Form 5 study period (usually in November). Students in the upper secondary have the option choosing from different “packages” of subjects depending on their Stream, interests, and PT3 results.

Subjects 
Different subjects are offered for Lower and Upper Secondary students.

Lower Secondary (Forms 1–3)

[1] Students must choose only one of the two options.

[2] Compulsory for Muslim students.

[3] Compulsory for non-Muslim students.

Upper Secondary (Forms 4–5)

Core Subjects

[2] Compulsory for Muslim students.

[3] Compulsory for non-Muslim students.

[4] Compulsory for non-Science Stream students.

External links 
  

Secondary schools in Malaysia